Kaldar may refer to:

 Kaldar, Samangan, a village in Samangan Province, Afghanistan
 Kaldar District, in Balkh Province, Afghanistan
 Kaldar, a fictional world in stories by Edmond Hamilton

See also
 Khaldar, a village in West Azerbaijan Province, Iran